The 1999–2000 season was the 62nd season of competitive association football in the Football League played by Chester City, an English club based in Chester, Cheshire.

Also, it was the fifth season spent in the Third Division, after the relegation from the Second Division in 1995. Alongside competing in the Football League the club also participated in the FA Cup, the Football League Cup and the Football League Trophy.

Football League

Results summary

Results by matchday

Matches

FA Cup

League Cup

Football League Trophy

Season statistics

References

External links

1999–2000
English football clubs 1999–2000 season